Hiraishi (written: 平石) is a Japanese surname. Notable people with the surname include:

, Japanese footballer
, Japanese footballer
Takenori Hiraishi, Japanese golfer
, Japanese baseball player

See also
Hiraishi Station, a railway station in Yokote, Akita Prefecture, Japan

Japanese-language surnames